The Iranian Women's Volleyball Premier League is a professional women's volleyball league in Iran. It was founded in 1975 as the Shahbanu Cup, but after the Iranian Revolution it was renamed to the first Division. In 2001 the league system was revamped and the Iranian Women's Volleyball Premier League was established. Zob Ahan Isfahan has won the most titles in the new Premier League with 6 titles.

The Premier League is the top tier of an extensive pyramid-like structure, above the 1st Division and the 2nd Division.

Current clubs
Jahanbin Chahrmahal Bakhtiyari 
Mes Rafsanjan 
Paykan Tehran
Saipa Tehran
Sedigh Goftar Varna 
Serik Gonbad 
Toloue Mehr Yazd 
Zob Ahan Isfahan

League champions

Premier League

Titles by club

See also
Iranian Volleyball Super League

References

External links
I.R. Iran Volleyball Federation

League
Women's sports leagues in Iran
Iran
Sports leagues established in 1975
Professional sports leagues in Iran